was a Japanese musician, author and socialist activist. He was best known as frontman of the influential punk rock band The Stalin. He gained notoriety for his stage antics, having once thrown a severed pig's head into the audience.

Early life and career 
Endo was born in Nihonmatsu, Fukushima and graduated from Yamagata University. After college he wandered through Vietnam and Southeast Asia. He formed The Stalin in 1980, they went on to be one of the dominant acts of the 80s Japanese punk rock scene.

Endo released his first solo material in 1984. In 2002 he formed the trio Notalin's. Two years later, he and Thee Michelle Gun Elephant drummer Kazuyuki Kuhara formed the acoustic trio M.J.Q, whose motto is "unplugged punk".

On December 1, 2010, two tribute albums were released. One entitled Romantist – The Stalin, Michiro Endo Tribute Album, which features bands such as Buck-Tick, Dir en grey, Group Tamashii and Jun Togawa covering The Stalin and Endo's solo songs. The other Red Demon, Blue Demon – Michiro Endo 60th Birthday Anniversary Tribute Album, features different artists and was first released at Endo's concert on November 14 to coincide with his 60th birthday.

Endo was still active on the live scene in the 2010s, as a solo performer, playing in M.J.Q, or with the occasional The Stalin concert.

Death 
Michiro Endo died in a Tokyo hospital while battling pancreatic cancer on April 25, 2019, aged 68. A representative announced his death on May 1 and that he had previously undergone surgery for the cancer in October 2018.

Discography

Singles 
 
 
 "Lucky Boy" (1987)

Albums 
 
 The End (1985)
 
 
 Get the Help! (1985)
 
 Terminal (1987)
 
 
 50 (Half) (1995)
 
 
 
 Off (2000)
 Aipa (2000)
 Notalin's (2004, with Notalin's)
 I, My, Me / Amami (2005)
 Unplugged Punk (2006, with M.J.Q)
 Kiga-Kiga Kikyo (2007)
 Aipa (December 12, 2009)
 
 Fukushima (2015)

Other work 
 Parade -Respective Tracks of Buck-Tick- (December 21, 2005, "Sasayaki")

References

External links 
 
 
 
 

1950 births
2019 deaths
Japanese rock guitarists
Japanese male rock singers
Japanese male actors
Japanese socialists
Japanese punk rock musicians
Punk rock singers
Punk rock guitarists
Musicians from Fukushima Prefecture
Writers from Fukushima Prefecture
Deaths from pancreatic cancer
20th-century Japanese guitarists
21st-century Japanese guitarists
20th-century Japanese male singers
20th-century Japanese singers
21st-century Japanese male singers
21st-century Japanese singers